Alberto Boccianti was an Italian art director who designed the sets for more than a hundred films during his career.

Selected filmography
 Two Hearts Among the Beasts (1943)
 Special Correspondents (1943)
 Come Back to Sorrento (1945)
 The Brothers Karamazov (1947)
 The Street Has Many Dreams (1948)
 Toto Looks for a Wife (1950)
 Red Seal (1950)
 Figaro Here, Figaro There (1950)
 The Transporter (1950)
 The Young Caruso (1951)
 Toto the Third Man (1951)
 The Steamship Owner (1951)
 Free Escape (1951)
 Song of Spring (1951)
 My Heart Sings (1951)
 Don Lorenzo (1952)
 Poppy (1952)
 Sardinian Vendetta (1952)
 Red Love (1952)
 The Enchanting Enemy (1953)
 It Was She Who Wanted It! (1953)

References

Bibliography
 Bayman, Louis. Directory of World Cinema: Italy. Intellect Books, 2011.

External links

Year of birth unknown
Year of death unknown
Italian art directors